Podia Ser Pior is a 2009 Brazilian comedy film written and directed by Ian SBF, and starring Fábio Porchat, Tatá Werneck, Danilo Gentili, Fernando Caruso, Gregório Duvivier, Josie Antello and Wagner Santisteban. The release of the film didn't happen due to a lack of budget revenue for the promotion.

Plot
Rodrigo (Fabio Porchat) wakes up in a strange bed next to a woman who he has never seen in life. Having his jaw dislocated, he rushes to save his relationship while trying to help his friend Murillo (Gregorio Duvivier), who is also with marital problems.

Cast 

 Fábio Porchat as Rodrigo
 Gregório Duvivier as Murillo
 Fernando Caruso as Gabriel
 Danilo Gentili as Danilo
 Letícia Lima as Suellen
 Tatá Werneck as Talita
 Paulo Serra as Paulinho
 Paulo Carvalho 
 Carine Klimeck 
 Josie Antello as  Josie
 Wagner Santisteban as Giovani

References

External links 
 

Unreleased films
Brazilian comedy films